Katsuteru (written: 勝照 or 家照) is a masculine Japanese given name. Notable people with the name include:

, Japanese sumo wrestler
, Japanese samurai

Japanese masculine given names